Poonam or Punam (Hindi: पूनम) is a Hindu/Sanskrit Indian predominantly feminine given name, which means "full moon". Notable people with the name include:

Poonam 
 Poonam Bajwa (born 1989), Indian actress and model
 Poonam Dhillon (born 1962), Indian actress
 Poonam Joshi (born 1970), Indian actress
 Poonam Kaur (born 1986), Indian actress and model
 Poonam Kishore Saxena (born 1953), Indian IRS officer
 Poonam Mahajan Rao (born 1980), Indian politician and member of Parliament from Mumbai North Central
 Poonam Pandey (born 1991), Indian actress and model
 Poonam Sinha (born 1949), Indian actress
Poonam Chand Vishnoi (1924–2006), Indian politician, Speaker of the Rajasthan Legislative Assembly 1980–1985

Punam 

 Punam Anand Keller, American economist and professor of Management
 Punam Barla (born 1995), Indian field hockey player
 Punam Devi, Indian politician and activist
 Punam Patel, American actress
 Punam Raut (born 1989), Indian cricketer
 Punam Reddy, Indian tennis player
 Punam Suri, Indian educator, journalist and editor
 Punam Yadav (born 1995), Indian weightlifter

See also 
 Poonam Ki Raat, a 1965 film directed by Kishore Sahu

 Poonam (1981 film), directed by Harmesh Malhotra
Punam, 2006 Serbian documentary film
Pūnam, village in Iran

Hindu given names
Indian feminine given names